The United States women's national squash team represents United States in international squash team competitions, and is governed by the U.S. Squash.

Since 1979, United States has participated in three quarter finals of the World Squash Team Open.

Current team
 Amanda Sobhy
 Olivia Blatchford
 Sabrina Sobhy
 Reeham Sedky

Results

World Team Squash Championships

References

See also 
 U.S. Squash
 World Team Squash Championships
 United States men's national squash team

Squash teams
Women's national squash teams
Squash
Squash in the United States